The 2022–23 season is the ninth year of competitive football played by Mumbai City FC and the team's ninth in the Indian Super League. Mumbai City FC started their campaign undefeated, with two draws and a 2-0 home win against Odisha FC.

Mumbai City had a near-exemplary Durand Cup in their maiden campaign and became runner-ups. With two big wins, despite a draw and a defeat, they managed to qualify for the top spot in Group and then They earn hard-fought victories in the quarter-final and semi-final against Chennaiyin FC and Mohammedan SC respectively to secure their first-ever spot in a Durand Cup final. They lost against Bengaluru FC in the final.

Lallianzuala Chhangte is the club's top scorer with eight goals in all competitions, followed by Greg Stewart who has seven goals to his name. So far from 2 home league matches, the club attracted an average attendance at Mumbai Football Arena of only 3,931, an 71% decrease from 2019–20 season . It's the lowest among all teams in the season. The highest attendance recorded was 4,128 for their first home match against Odisha.

Review and events

Preseason and Durand Cup
After an impressive AFC Champions League campaign, Mumbai City FC strengthened their squad with the right number of signings but also by retentions from last year. They made only six changes to their Durand Cup squad from the AFC Champions League squad. The Islanders made their Durand Cup debut in Group B. They had a near exemplary group stage, as they won 5-1 and 4-1 against Rajasthan United FC and the Indian Navy respectively.

Player Details

Notes

References

Mumbai City FC seasons
Mumbai City FC